News @ 6 is the flagship evening newscast of PTV, which was aired from July 2, 2012, to July 9, 2016, replacing Teledyaryo and was replaced by PTV News. Shown every Mondays to Saturdays at 18:00 Philippine Standard Time, it is anchored by former Teledyaryo anchors Kathy San Gabriel, Aljo Bendijo and Ria Fernandez. And it is anchored by Ralph Obina and Ria Fernandez on Saturdays. The newscast is simulcast on radio through Radyo ng Bayan stations nationwide.

The program features a MMDA video traffic system used during the commercial breaks, weather updates from Panahon TV, and closing credits while a video showing Filipino Sign Language slightly shrunk away from that corner enclosed in an egg circle of the news for audience with visual difficulties for the blind and deaf persons and hearing impaired.

News @ 6 air their last broadcast on July 9, 2016, to make way for PTV News (Evening Edition).

Final Anchors
Aljo Bendijo (2015–2016)
Kathy San Gabriel (2012–2016)
Ria Fernandez (2014–2016)
Ralph Obina (2012–2016)

Past Anchors
Angelique Lazo (2012)
Atty. Marc Castrodes (2012–2014; now with RJTV-29)
Jorge Bandola (2014–2015 Saturday anchor now with DZXL)
Rocky Ignacio (2014–2015 Saturday anchor)

Segments
Ulat Malacañang – Report from Malacañang Correspondent Rocky Ignacio and Elena Luna.
GloBalita – Foreign News
Ulat Panahon – Weather News
Balitang ASEAN – Southeast Asia News
Sports Ngayon – Sports News
On the Road – Traffic Update

See also
 List of programs aired by People's Television Network

References 

Philippine television news shows
People's Television Network original programming
Sign language television shows
Filipino-language television shows
2012 Philippine television series debuts
2016 Philippine television series endings
Flagship evening news shows